Wheeling Island Historic District is a national historic district located on Wheeling Island in Wheeling, Ohio County, West Virginia. The district includes 1,110 contributing buildings, 5 contributing sites, 2 contributing structures, and 3 contributing objects.  It is a largely residential district consisting of two-story, frame detached dwellings built in the mid- to late-19th and early-20th century, including the Irwin-Brues House (1853) and a number of houses on Zane Street.  The houses are representative of a number of popular architectural styles including Bungalow, Italianate, Queen Anne, and Colonial Revival. Notable non-residential contributing properties include the Exposition Building (1924), Thompson United Methodist Church (1913-1915), Madison School (1916), firehouse (1930-1931), the Bridgeport Bridge (1893), the Aetnaville Bridge (1891), "The Marina," Wheeling Island Baseball Park, and "Belle Island Park."  It includes the separately listed Wheeling Suspension Bridge, Harry C. and Jessie F. Franzheim House, and John McLure House.

It was listed on the National Register of Historic Places in 1992.

References

External links

All of the following are located in Wheeling, Ohio County, WV:

National Register of Historic Places in Wheeling, West Virginia
Historic districts in Wheeling, West Virginia
Italianate architecture in West Virginia
Queen Anne architecture in West Virginia
Bungalow architecture in West Virginia
American Craftsman architecture in West Virginia
Historic districts on the National Register of Historic Places in West Virginia